Nine Men may refer to:

Nine Men, a citizens advisory board in New Netherland
Nine Men (film), a 1943 British patriotic movie
Nine men's morris, a board game
Nine Men's Misery, a veterans memorial